Pietro Orsini may refer to:
Pope Benedict XIII (1650–1730), Roman Catholic Pope
Pietro Orsini (bishop) (died 1598), Italian Roman Catholic Bishop